Gardineria may refer to:
 Gardineria (coral), a genus of corals in the family Gardineriidae
 Gardineria, a fossil genus of fishes in the family Karaunguriidae, synonym of Gardinerpiscis
 Gardineria, a genus of crustaceans in the family Pseudoziidae, synonym of Euryozius